Trimethoprim (TMP) is an antibiotic used mainly in the treatment of bladder infections. Other uses include for middle ear infections and travelers' diarrhea. With sulfamethoxazole or dapsone it may be used for Pneumocystis pneumonia in people with HIV/AIDS. It is taken by mouth.

Common side effects include nausea, changes in taste, and rash. Rarely it may result in blood problems such as not enough platelets or white blood cells. Trimethoprim may cause sun sensitivity. There is evidence of potential harm during pregnancy in some animals but not humans. It works by blocking folate metabolism via dihydrofolate reductase in some bacteria which results in their death.

Trimethoprim was first used in 1962. It is on the World Health Organization's List of Essential Medicines. It is available as a generic medication.

Medical uses
It is primarily used in the treatment of urinary tract infections, although it may be used against any susceptible aerobic bacterial species. It may also be used to treat and prevent Pneumocystis jirovecii pneumonia. It is generally not recommended for the treatment of anaerobic infections such as Clostridium difficile colitis (the leading cause of antibiotic-induced diarrhea). Trimethoprim has been used in trials to treat retinitis.

Resistance to trimethoprim is increasing, but it is still a first line antibiotic in many countries.

Spectrum of susceptibility
Cultures and susceptibility tests should be done to make sure bacteria are treated by trimethoprim.
 Escherichia coli
 Proteus mirabilis
 Klebsiella pneumoniae
 Enterobacter species
 Coagulase-negative Staphylococcus species, including S. saprophyticus
 Streptococcus pneumoniae
 Haemophilus influenzae

Side effects

Common 
 Nauseas
 Change in taste
 Vomiting
 Diarrhea
 Rashes
 Sun sensitivity
 Itchiness

Rare 
 Can cause thrombocytopenia (low levels of platelets) by lowering folic acid levels; this may also cause megaloblastic anemia.
 Trimethoprim antagonizes the epithelial sodium channel  in the distal tubule, thus acting like amiloride.  This can cause increased potassium levels in the body (hyperkalemia).
 Can compete with creatinine for secretion into the renal tubule.  This can cause an artificial rise in the serum creatinine.
 Use in EHEC infections may lead to an increase in expression of Shiga toxin.

Contraindications 
 Known hypersensitivity to trimethoprim
 History of megaloblastic anemia due to folate deficiency

It may be involved in a reaction similar to disulfiram when alcohol is consumed after it is used, in particular when used in combination with sulfamethoxazole.

Pregnancy 
Based on the studies that show that trimethoprim crosses the placenta and can affect folate metabolism, there has been growing evidence of the risk of structural birth defects associated with trimethoprim, especially during the first trimester of pregnancy.

The trophoblasts in the early fetus are sensitive to changes in the folate cycle. A recent study has found a doubling in the risk of miscarriage in women exposed to trimethoprim in the early pregnancy.

Mechanism of action

Trimethoprim binds to dihydrofolate reductase and inhibits the reduction of dihydrofolic acid (DHF) to tetrahydrofolic acid (THF). THF is an essential precursor in the thymidine synthesis pathway and interference with this pathway inhibits bacterial DNA synthesis. Trimethoprim's inhibitory activity for bacterial dihydrofolate reductase is sixty thousand times greater than for human dihydrofolate reductase. Sulfamethoxazole inhibits dihydropteroate synthase, an enzyme involved further upstream in the same pathway. Trimethoprim and sulfamethoxazole are commonly used in combination due to possible synergistic effects, and reduced development of resistance. This benefit has been questioned.

History
Trimethoprim was first used in 1962. In 1972, it was used as a prophylactic treatment for urinary tract infections in Finland.

Its name is derived from trimethyloxy-pyrimidine.

See also
 Tetroxoprim
 Iclaprim

References

External links
 

Antibiotics
Antimetabolites
Aromatic amines
Bacterial dihydrofolate reductase inhibitors
Phenol ethers
Protozoal dihydrofolate reductase inhibitors
Pyrimidines
World Health Organization essential medicines
Wikipedia medicine articles ready to translate
CYP2C8 inhibitors